USS Dolphin (SP-262) was the proposed name and designation for a United States Navy patrol vessel that the Navy never actually acquired.

Dolphin was built as the commercial steam fishing vessel  Virginia at Pocomoke City, Maryland. She was of the "menhaden fisherman" design. She was rebuilt in 1911, and at some point between 1908 and 1917 was renamed Dolphin.

The U.S. Navy considered acquiring Dolphin in 1917 for World War I service as a patrol vessel and assigned her the section patrol number SP-318. Although reported by some contemporary sources as having been placed in commission in February 1919 as USS Dolphin (SP-318), she in fact appears never to have been acquired by the Navy and to have remained in civilian hands.

Notes

References
Department of the Navy: Navy History and Heritage Command: Online Library of Selected Images: Civilian Ships: Virginia (American Fishing Vessel, 1908). Later renamed Dolphin
NavSource Online: Section Patrol Craft Photo Archive: Dolphin (SP 318)

Patrol vessels of the United States Navy
Cancelled ships of the United States Navy
Ships built in Pocomoke City, Maryland
1908 ships